Hana Mandlíková and Wendy Turnbull were the defending champions but they competed with different partners that year, Mandlíková with Jana Novotná and Turnbull with Elizabeth Smylie.

Mandlíková and Novotná lost in the quarterfinals to Jo Durie and Sharon Walsh-Pete.

Smylie and Turnbull lost in the semifinals to Claudia Kohde-Kilsch and Helena Suková.

Betsy Nagelsen and Pam Shriver won in the final 2–6, 7–5, 6–2 against Kohde-Kilsch and Suková.

Seeds
Champion seeds are indicated in bold text while text in italics indicates the round in which those seeds were eliminated. The top four seeded teams received byes into the second round.

Draw

Final

Top half

Bottom half

References
 1988 Ariadne Classic Doubles Draw

1988 Doubles
1988 WTA Tour
1988 in Australian tennis